Michel Peyramaure (30 January 192211 March 2023) was a French writer. He received the 1979 Grand prix de littérature de la SGDL.

Publications  
 Paradis entre quatre murs, Robert Laffont, 1954
 Le Bal des ribauds, Robert Laffont, « Couleurs du temps passé », 1955 ; réédition, Les Monédières, 1983 
 Divine Cléopâtre, Robert Laffont, « Couleurs du temps passé », 1957
 Les Lions d'Aquitaine, Robert Laffont, 1957
 L’Aigle des deux royaumes (Aliénor d'Aquitaine), Robert Laffont, « Couleurs du temps passé », 1959
 Dieu m'attend à Médina, le roman d'Isabelle la Catholique, Robert Laffont, 1960
 La Fille des grandes plaines, Robert Laffont, « Bibliothèque pour tous », 1963
 Les Cendrillons de Monaco, Robert Laffont, « L' Amour et la couronne », 1964
 Les Dieux de plumes, Presses de la Cité, 1965
 La Vallée des mammouths, Robert Laffont, « Plein Vent » , 1966 ; réédition, Gallimard-Jeunesse, « Folio junior », 1980
 Les Colosses de Carthage, Robert Laffont, « Plein Vent » , 1967 ; réédition, Pocket, septembre 1999 
 Cordillère interdite, Robert Laffont, « Plein Vent » , 1970
 Le Chevalier de paradis, Casterman, « La Palme d'or », 1971 ; réédition, Lucien Souny, juin 1991 
 Le Rétable, Robert Laffont, mars 1971 ; réédition sous le titre Le Retable, L. Souny, 1990
 L'Œil arraché, Robert Laffont, 1974
 L’Auberge de la mort : l'énigme de Peyrebeille, 1833 (l'histoire vraie de l'auberge sanglante à Peyrebeille), Éditions Pygmalion, « Bibliothèque infernale », 1976 ; réédition sous le titre L'Auberge rouge : l'énigme de Peyrebeille, 1833, Éditions Pygmalion, « Bibliothèque infernale », 2001
 Nous irons décrocher les nuages, Robert Laffont, « Plein Vent » , 1976
 La Passion Cathare :
 Vol. 1 : Les Fils de l’orgueil, Robert Laffont, 1977 
 Vol. 2 : Les Citadelles ardentes, Robert Laffont, 1978 
 Vol. 3 : La Tête du dragon, Robert Laffont, 1978 
 Autour du Limousin, texte de Michel Peyramaure ; lithographies originales de Jean-Baptiste Valadié, Plaisir du livre, 1977
 Sentiers et randonnées du Limousin, cartes exécutées par Michel Pluvinage, Fayard, 1979
 La Lumière et la Boue (roman de la guerre de Cent Ans)
 Vol. 1 : Quand surgira l’étoile Absinthe, Robert Laffont, 1980 
 Vol. 2 : L’Empire des fous, Robert Laffont, 1980 
 Vol. 3 : Les Roses de fer, Robert Laffont, 1981 
 L'Orange de Noël, Robert Laffont, 1982 
 Le Printemps des pierres, Robert Laffont, février 1983 
 Les Montagnes du jour : monographie sentimentale des Monédières, Éditions les Monédières, 1983
 Les Empires de cendre (La conquête de la Gaule vue par César et un jeune grec intégré en pays Arvernes) :
 Les Portes de Gergovie, Robert Laffont, décembre 1983 
 La Chair et le Bronze, Robert Laffont, février 1985 
 La Porte noire, Robert Laffont, février 1986 
 Amour du Limousin, photogr. de Bernard Tardien et Jean-François Amelot, Pierre Fanlac éditeur, 1986
 La Caverne magique, Robert Laffont, juin 1986 
 La Division maudite (roman-document sur la marche de l'armée allemande de Montauban au front de Normandie, par Tulle et Oradour-sur-Glane), Robert Laffont, 1987
 La Passion Béatrice (d'après le scénario original de Colo Tavernier O'Hagan), Robert Laffont, octobre 1987 
 Je suis Napoléon (roman jeunesse), Belfond, 1989
 Les Dames de Marsanges :
 Vol. 1 : Les Dames de Marsanges, Robert Laffont, mai 1988 
 Vol. 2 : La Montagne terrible, Robert Laffont, février 1989 
 Vol. 3 : Demain, après l'orage, Robert Laffont, mars 1990 
 Napoléon : Chronique romanesque :
 Vol. 1 : L’Étoile Bonaparte, Robert Laffont, 1991
 Vol. 2 : L’Aigle et la Foudre, Robert Laffont, 1991
 Les Flammes du paradis, Robert Laffont, mai 1992 
 Les Tambours sauvages (roman sur les premiers colons français dans la colonie française de Canada), Presses de la Cité, 1992
 Le Beau Monde. Histoire d'Anna Labrousse, servante, Robert Laffont, janvier 1994 
 Les Demoiselles des écoles, Robert Laffont, 1994 
 Pacifique sud - Bougainville à Tahiti, Presse de la Cité, avril 1994 
 Martial Chabannes, gardien des ruines, Éditions Seghers, 1995
 Louisiana (l'épopée des premiers colons français de Louisiane), Presses de la Cité, 1996
 Un monde à sauver, Bartillat, 1996
 Cléopâtre, reine du Nil, Robert Laffont, mai 1997 
 Henri IV
 Vol. 1 : L'Enfant roi de Navarre (+ appendice Despeches de guerre & d'amour du Béarnais), Robert Laffont, 1998
 Vol. 2 : Ralliez-vous à mon panache blanc !, Robert Laffont, 1998
 Vol. 3 : Les Amours, les Passions et la Gloire, Robert Laffont, 1998
 Suzanne Valadon :
 Vol. 1 : Les Escaliers de Montmartre, Robert Laffont, 1998
 Vol. 2 : Le Temps des ivresses, Robert Laffont, 1998
 Lavalette, grenadier d'Égypte, Robert Laffont, 1998 
 La Tour des anges - Le palais des papes en Avignon, Robert Laffont, 1998
 La Cabane aux fées et autres histoires mystérieuses, Éditions du Rocher, « Mystères des provinces », 1999
 Jeanne d'Arc
 Vol. 1 : Et Dieu donnera la victoire, Robert Laffont, 1999
 Vol. 2 : La Couronne de feu, Robert Laffont, 1999
 Vu du clocher, Bartillat, 1999
 Les Chiens sauvages, Robert Laffont, 2000
 Le Roman des Croisades :
 La Croix et le Royaume, Robert Laffont, 2001
 Les Étendards du Temple, Robert Laffont, 2001
 Le Roman de Catherine de Médicis, Presse de la Cité, 2002
 La Divine - Le Roman de Sarah Bernhardt, Robert Laffont, mai 2002
 Le Bonheur des Charmettes, éditions de la Table Ronde, 2002 ; réédition, éditions de Borée, octobre 2008 (jeunesse de Jean-Jacques Rousseau)
 Fille de la colère. Le Roman de Louise Michel, Robert Laffont, janvier 2003
 Balades des chemins creux, nouvelles, éditions Anne Carrère, 2003
 Les Bals de Versailles, Robert Laffont, décembre 2003 (sur les amours de Louis XIV)
 Un château rose en Corrèze, Presses de la Cité, « Romans Terres de France », 2003
 Le Pays Cathare en aquarelles, Ouest-France, 2003 (livre touristique sur le Languedoc-Roussillon
 Soupes d'orties, Anne Carrière, 2003
 Les Grandes Falaises (roman de la Préhistoire), Presses de la Cité, 2003
 Les Amants maudits - George Sand, Musset, Chopin, Robert Laffont, 2004
 Les Fleuves de Babylone, Presses de la Cité, novembre 2005
 Les Fêtes galantes, Robert Laffont, 2005
 Le Parc-aux-Cerfs, Robert Laffont, 2005
 Le Temps des moussons, Presses de la Cité, 2006 
 Les Prisonniers de Cabrera- L'Exil forcé des soldats de Napoléon
 Les Trois Bandits :
 Vol. 1 : Cartouche, Robert Laffont, mai 2006 
 Vol. 2 : Mandrin, Robert Laffont, février 2007 
 Vol. 3 : Vidocq, Robert Laffont, mai 2007 
 Le Chat et la Plume, La Lauze, octobre 2007 
 La Petite Danseuse de Degas, Paris, Bartillat, 2007 
 La Vallée endormie Robert Laffont, 2007
 Les Femmes de la Révolution :
 Vol. 1 : La Reine de Paris - Le Roman de Madame Tallien, Robert Laffont, 2008
 Vol. 2 : L’Ange de la paix - Le Roman d'Olympe de Gouges, Robert Laffont, novembre 2008
 Vol. 3 : Les Grandes Libertines - Le Roman de Sophie Arnould et Françoise Raucourt, Robert Laffont, 2009
 Conditionnel passé, texte in Inconnues corréziennes, résonance d'écrivains, ouvrage collectif, éditions Libel, 2009
 Les Villes du silence - Le Roman des Étrusques, Calmann-Lévy, mai 2010 
 Le Bal des célibataires (suite de L'Orange de Noël, ce roman a été écrit postérieurement au téléfilm éponyme et s'est librement inspiré de son scénario original).
 Batailles en Margeride, éditions du Rouergue, mars 2005 (sur les maquis de la Résistance en Limousin)
 Le Château de la chimère, éditions de la Table ronde, 2009
 La Confession impériale, Robert Laffont, 2010 
 Tempête sur le Mexique, Calmann-Lévy, 2011 
 Un vent de paradis - Le Roman des troubadours, NIL, 2011 
 Mourir pour Saragosse, Calmann-Lévy, 2012 
 Beaux Nuages du soir, Robert Laffont, 2012 
 Les Folies de la duchesse d’Abrantès, Calmann-Lévy, 2013 
 Les Rivales : Lucrèce Borgia et Isabelle d'Este, Robert Laffont, 2014 
 La Maison des tourbières, Calmann-Lévy, 2015 
 Un château rose en Corrèze, Presse de la Cité, « Terres de France », 2003 et 2011
 Le Pays du bel espoir, Presse de la Cité, 2004
 Les Roses noires de Saint-Domingue, Presse de la Cité, « Sud lointain », 2007 
 La Porte du non-retour, Presse de la Cité, 2008
 Les Épées de feu, Robert Laffont, 2013 
 L’Orpheline de la forêt Barade, Calmann-Lévy, 2014
 Trois Cavaliers dans la forêt, Ouest-France, 2017
 Les Tentes noires, Calmann-Lévy, septembre 2018
 Le Sabre de l’Empire, Robert Laffont, 2015 
 La Non Pareille, Calmann-Lévy, 2019 
 La Scandaleuse, Calmann-Lévy, 2020 
 La Vie passionnée : le roman de Marceline Desbordes-Valmore, Calmann-Lévy, 2021 
 Inventaire avant fermeture : vivre en province, Calmann-Lévy, 2021

References

1922 births
2023 deaths
20th-century French male writers
21st-century French male writers
French historical novelists
French centenarians
Men centenarians
People from Brive-la-Gaillarde